A Cajun accordion (in Cajun French: accordéon), also known as a squeezebox, is single-row diatonic button accordion used for playing Cajun music.

History
Many different accordions were developed in Europe throughout the 19th century, and exported worldwide.  Accordions were brought to Acadiana in the 1890s and became popular by the early 1900s (decade), eventually becoming a staple of Cajun music.

Many of the German factories producing diatonic accordions for the United States market were destroyed during World War II.  As a result, some Cajuns, such as Sidney Brown, began producing their own instruments, based on the popular one-row German accordions but with modifications to suit the nuances of the Cajun playing style.  Since the end of World War II, there has been a surge in the number of Cajun accordion makers in Louisiana, as well as several in Texas.

Construction

The Cajun accordion is generally defined as a single-row diatonic accordion, as compared to multiple-row instruments commonly used in Irish, Italian, polka, and other styles of music.  The Cajun accordion has multiple reeds for every button, and the number of reeds that sound is controlled by four stops or knobs. The standard number of melody buttons is ten, with two buttons on the left-hand side: one for the bass note and one for the chord. The tonic note and major chord of the key play on when the bellows are pushed, and the dominant note and major chord when pulled (for instance, C major and G major respectively in the key of C). Louisiana-constructed accordions are usually built in small backyard shops like Marc Savoy's Acadian brand and Larry Miller's Bon Cajun brand. Clarence "Junior" Martin of Lafayette Louisiana is a Master Craftsman who also builds accordions in his shop.

Characteristics
The most common tuning utilized is the key of C, although the key of D is also relatively common.  Some rarer accordions are constructed in the key of B flat. Cajun accordions are traditionally tuned to a Just Intonation.

Notable players
Although the instrument is called a Cajun accordion, both zydeco and creole musicians play the Cajun accordion with a zydeco and creole sound respectively.  Each musician below is considered important in influencing accordion technique and image.
Nathan Abshire
Alphonse "Bois Sec" Ardoin
Amédé Ardoin
Lee Benoit
Jackie Caillier
Boozoo Chavis
Geno Delafose
John Delafose
Dewey Balfa
Joe Falcon
Iry LeJeune
Steve Riley
Aldus Roger
Marc Savoy
Jo-El Sonnier
Wayne Toups
Lawrence Walker
William LaBouve
Terrance Simien and the Zydeco Experience

Manufacturers and builders
Hohner (Germany)
Andre Michot (Louisiana, United States)
Larry Miller (Louisiana, United States)
Marc Savoy (Louisiana, United States)
Greg Mouton (Louisiana, United States)

Gallery

See also
Bandoneon
Diatonic button accordion
Piano accordion
Cajun French Music Association
List of people related to Cajun music
History of Cajun music
Fiddle

References

Accordion
 
Cajun musical instruments